John Alexander McDougall (May 20, 1854 – December 17, 1928) was a businessman and politician in Alberta, Canada, He served as a municipal councillor, mayor and a member of the Legislative Assembly of Alberta.

Early life

John Alexander McDougall was born May 20, 1854 in Oakwood, Canada West (now Ontario) to Alexander J. McDougall and Janet Cummings. His father died in 1867 when John was thirteen. He left school and worked to support his family.

In 1873, he moved to Fort Garry (now Winnipeg) where he worked as a fur trader and completed his education at Manitoba College. In 1877 this work brought him to Edmonton, where he decided to settle, but not before returning to Ontario in 1878 to marry his high school sweetheart, Lovisa Jane Amey (1878-1943), with whom he had three sons and three daughters. The pair settled in Edmonton in 1879, where McDougall commenced trading furs in competition with the Hudson's Bay Company.

In 1881, he was one of ten Edmontonians to guarantee the five hundred dollar annual salary of the settlement's first schoolteacher.

He became a justice of the peace in 1885.

Business career

McDougall ran a general store in Edmonton starting in 1879. Soon he began to specialize in buying and selling furs.

John McDougall was the first president of the Edmonton Board of Trade, in 1889.

In 1896, McDougall joined with fellow Edmonton pioneer businessman Richard Secord and founded McDougall & Secord. This business advertised itself as "general merchants, wholesale and retail; buyers and exporters of raw furs; dealers in land scrip and north west lands; outfitters for survey parties, traders, trappers, miners and others for the north, and suppliers for country stores."  The two ran the company until 1907, when they sold it.

Besides the fur trade, McDougall & Secord did a major business in buying Metis scrip and re-selling it at a profit. Sometimes a scrip, a mere scrap paper, could be obtained for a bottle of whiskey, then could be used to obtain 160 acres of choice farmland which then sold for $2 an acre. Alleged schemes that Secord used to secure scrip at that time are described in Rob Houle's research "Richard Henry Secord and Metis Scrip Speculation" (June 2016), available on-line.

With this business and their other lines, McDougall and Secord became millionaires by the time Alberta became a province in 1905.

In 1907, the two went into business as a financial house and mortgage corporation called McDougall & Secord, Limited. McDougall operated this company until his death, when its leadership was taken over by his son John Charles McDougall. It has now been closed permanently.

Political career

In 1892, McDougall ran for alderman of Edmonton's first town council. He was narrowly defeated, finishing seventh place (16 votes behind sixth place Philip Daly) out of fourteen candidates in an election in which the top six candidates were elected.

He ran again in 1893 and finished first of nine candidates and was elected.

He was re-elected in 1894 (finishing second of nine candidates, behind Colin Strang) . He was elected to the public school board the same year (he served one year).

In 1895 McDougall ran for mayor against Herbert Charles Wilson, but was defeated, 129 votes to 91.

He made another attempt in 1896 and became mayor. He did not seek re-election in 1897, and stayed out of politics for the next decade.

In 1907 McDougall was again elected mayor, defeating Joseph Henri Picard 1217 votes to 437. During his second term as mayor, he installed an automatic telephone system in the city and oversaw the establishment of a street railway as a municipal operation. He did not seek re-election in 1908.

A Liberal, in 1909 he was elected as one of the two Members of the Legislative Assembly for Edmonton. He served his term, but did not seek re-election in 1913, when he was 59 years of age and decided to devote his energies to his business activities.

Last years and legacy

McDougall spent many of his last years traveling the world with his wife. He died in Edmonton on December 17, 1928. He had been active with the Presbyterian Church, the Masonic Order and the Edmonton Club.

McDougall was one of the founders of St. John Ambulance in Alberta.

John A. McDougall School is named in his honour.

McDougall & Secord, Limited exists in Edmonton to this day, believed to be the oldest surviving company in Alberta. Its precursors—McDougall's General Store and Secord's Fur Store and Warehouse—are reproduced on 1885 Street in Fort Edmonton Park.

Footnotes

References

Real Estate Weekly biography of John McDougall
Edmonton Public Library Biography of McDougall
City of Edmonton biography of McDougall
Minutes of the City of Edmonton's Naming Committee, January 18, 2006
History of St. John Ambulance in Alberta

1854 births
1928 deaths
Pre-Confederation Alberta people
Alberta Liberal Party MLAs
Mayors of Edmonton
Canadian people of Scottish descent
Edmonton city councillors
Canadian fur traders
People from Kawartha Lakes
Canadian Presbyterians
19th-century Canadian politicians
20th-century Canadian politicians